This is a list of the squads for the 2020 CONCACAF Women's U-20 Championship in Dominican Republic between February 22 and March 8, 2020. The 16 national teams involved in the tournament were required to register a squad of 20 players each; only players in these squads were eligible to take part in the tournament.

Players marked (c) were named as captain for their national squad.

Group C

Cuba
Coach:  Edelsio Griego

Dominican Republic
Coach:  Diego Gutiérrez

Honduras
Coach:

United States
Coach:  Laura Harvey

Group D

Guyana
Coach:  Dr. Ivan Joseph

Mexico
Coach:  Mónica Vergara

Nicaragua
Coach: Elna Dixon

Puerto Rico
Coach:  Elias Llabres

Group E

Canada
Coach:  Rhian Wilkinson

El Salvador
Coach: Elías Ramírez

Guatemala
Coach:

Jamaica
Coach:   Xavier Gilbert

Group F

Cayman Islands 
Coach:

Haiti
Coach:  Laurent Mortel

Saint Kitts and Nevis
Coach:

Trinidad and Tobago
Coach: Richard Hood

References

External links
 Rosters

squads